The 1995 San Jose SaberCats season was the first season for the San Jose SaberCats. They finished the 1995 Arena Football League season 8–4 and ended the season with a loss in the quarterfinals of the playoffs against the Orlando Predators.

Schedule

Regular season

Playoffs
The SaberCats were awarded the No. 3 seed in the AFL playoffs.

Standings

Awards

References

San Jose SaberCats seasons
1995 Arena Football League season
San Jose SaberCats Season, 1995